Weight training is a common type of strength training for developing the strength, size of skeletal muscles and maintenance of strength. It uses the force of gravity in the form of weighted bars, dumbbells or weight stacks in order to oppose the force generated by muscle through concentric or eccentric contraction. Weight training uses a variety of specialized equipment to target specific muscle groups and types of movement.

Sports in which weight training is used include bodybuilding, weightlifting, powerlifting, strongman, highland games,armwrestling and crossfit. Many other sports use strength training as part of their training regimen, notably: American football, baseball, basketball,  cricket, football, hockey, lacrosse, martial arts, rowing, rugby, track and field.

History
 

The genealogy of lifting can be traced back to the beginning of recorded history where humanity's fascination with physical abilities can be found among numerous ancient writings. In many prehistoric tribes, they would have a big rock they would try to lift, and the first one to lift it would inscribe their name into the stone. Such rocks have been found in Greek and Scottish castles. Progressive resistance training dates back at least to Ancient Greece, when legend has it that wrestler Milo of Croton trained by carrying a newborn calf on his back every day until it was fully grown. Another Greek, the physician Galen, described strength training exercises using the halteres (an early form of dumbbell) in the 2nd century.

Ancient Greek sculptures also depict lifting feats. The weights were generally stones, but later gave way to dumbbells. The dumbbell was joined by the barbell in the later half of the 19th century. Early barbells had hollow globes that could be filled with sand or lead shot, but by the end of the century these were replaced by the plate-loading barbell commonly used today.

Another early device was the Indian club, which came from ancient India, where it was called the "mugdar" or ''gada''. It subsequently became popular during the 19th century, and has recently made a comeback in the form of the clubbell.

Weightlifting was first introduced in the Olympics in the 1896 Athens Olympic Games as a part of track and field, and was officially recognized as its own event in 1914.

The 1960s saw the gradual introduction of exercise machines into the still-rare strength training gyms of the time. Weight training became increasingly popular in the 1970s, following the release of the bodybuilding movie Pumping Iron, and the subsequent popularity of Arnold Schwarzenegger. Since the late 1990s, increasing numbers of women have taken up weight training; currently, nearly one in five U.S. women engage in weight training on a regular basis.

Basic principles

The basic principles of weight training are essentially identical to those of strength training, and involve a manipulation of the number of repetitions (reps), sets, tempo, exercise types, and weight moved to cause desired increases in strength, endurance, and size. The specific combinations of reps, sets, exercises, and weights depends on the aims of the individual performing the exercise.

In addition to the basic principles of strength training, a further consideration added by weight training is the equipment used. Types of equipment include barbells, dumbbells, kettlebells, pulleys and stacks in the form of weight machines, and the body's own weight in the case of chin-ups and push-ups. Different types of weights will give different types of resistance, and often the same absolute weight can have different relative weights depending on the type of equipment used. For example, lifting 10 kilograms using a dumbbell sometimes requires more force than moving 10 kilograms on a weight stack if certain pulley arrangements are used. In other cases, the weight stack may require more force than the equivalent dumbbell weight due to additional torque or resistance in the machine. Additionally, although they may display the same weight stack, different machines may be heavier or lighter depending on the number of pulleys and their arrangements.

Weight training also requires the use of proper or 'good form', performing the movements with the appropriate muscle group, and not transferring the weight to different body parts in order to move greater weight (called 'cheating'). Failure to use good form during a training set can result in injury or a failure to meet training goals. If the desired muscle group is not challenged sufficiently, the threshold of overload is never reached and the muscle does not gain in strength. At a particularly advanced level; however, "cheating" can be used to break through strength plateaus and encourage neurological and muscular adaptation.

Safety
Weight training is a safe form of exercise when the movements are controlled and carefully defined. However, as with any form of exercise, improper execution and the failure to take appropriate precautions can result in injury. If injured, full recovery is suggested before starting to weight train again or it may result in a bigger injury.

Maintaining proper form

Maintaining proper form is one of the many steps in order to perfectly perform a certain technique. Correct form in weight training improves strength, muscle tone, and maintaining a healthy weight. Proper form will prevent any strains or fractures. When the exercise becomes difficult towards the end of a set, there is a temptation to cheat, i.e., to use poor form to recruit other muscle groups to assist the effort. Avoid heavy weight and keep the number of repetitions to a  minimum. This may shift the effort to weaker muscles that cannot handle the weight. For example, the squat and the deadlift are used to exercise the largest muscles in the body—the leg and buttock muscles—so they require substantial weight. Beginners are tempted to round their back while performing these exercises. The relaxation of the spinal erectors which allows the lower back to round can cause shearing in the vertebrae of the lumbar spine, potentially damaging the spinal discs.

Stretching and warm-up
Weight trainers spend time warming up their muscles before starting a workout. It is common to stretch the entire body to increase overall flexibility; many people stretch just the area being worked that day. It has been observed that static stretching can increase the risk of injury due to its analgesic effect and cellular damage caused by it. A proper warm-up routine, however, has shown to be effective in minimizing the chances of injury, especially if they are done with the same movements performed in the weight lifting exercise. When properly warmed up the lifter will have more strength and stamina since the blood has begun to flow to the muscle groups.

Breathing
In weight training, as with most forms of exercise, there is a tendency for the breathing pattern to deepen. This helps to meet increased oxygen requirements. Holding the breath or breathing shallowly is avoided because it may lead to a lack of oxygen, passing out, or an increase in blood pressure. Generally, the recommended breathing technique is to inhale when lowering the weight (the eccentric portion) and exhale when lifting the weight (the concentric portion). However, the reverse, inhaling when lifting and exhaling when lowering, may also be recommended. Some researchers state that there is little difference between the two techniques in terms of their influence on heart rate and blood pressure. It may also be recommended that a weight lifter simply breathes in a manner which feels appropriate.
 
Deep breathing may be specifically recommended for the lifting of heavy weights because it helps to generate intra-abdominal pressure which can help to strengthen the posture of the lifter, and especially their core.

In particular situations, a coach may advise performing the valsalva maneuver during exercises which place a load on the spine. The Valsalva maneuver consists of closing the windpipe and clenching the abdominal muscles as if exhaling, and is performed naturally and unconsciously by most people when applying great force. It serves to stiffen the abdomen and torso and assist the back muscles and spine in supporting the heavy weight. Although it briefly increases blood pressure, it is still recommended by weightlifting experts such as Rippetoe since the risk of a stroke by aneurysm is far lower than the risk of an orthopedic injury caused by inadequate rigidity of the torso. Some medical experts warn that the mechanism of building "high levels of intra-abdominal pressure (IAP)...produced by breath holding using the Valsalva maneuver", to "ensure spine stiffness and stability during these extraordinary demands", "should be considered only for extreme weight-lifting challenges — not for rehabilitation exercise".

Hydration
As with other sports, weight trainers should avoid dehydration throughout the workout by drinking sufficient water. This is particularly true in hot environments, or for those older than 65.

Some athletic trainers advise athletes to drink about  every 15 minutes while exercising, and about  throughout the day.

However, a much more accurate determination of how much fluid is necessary can be made by performing appropriate weight measurements before and after a typical exercise session, to determine how much fluid is lost during the workout. The greatest source of fluid loss during exercise is through perspiration, but as long as fluid intake is roughly equivalent to the rate of perspiration, hydration levels will be maintained.

Under most circumstances, sports drinks do not offer a physiological benefit over water during weight training. However, high-intensity exercise for a continuous duration of at least one hour may require the replenishment of electrolytes which a sports drink may provide.

Insufficient hydration may cause lethargy, soreness or muscle cramps. The urine of well-hydrated persons should be nearly colorless, while an intense yellow color is normally a sign of insufficient hydration.

Avoiding pain

An exercise should be halted if marked or sudden pain is felt, to prevent further injury. However, not all discomfort indicates injury. Weight training exercises are brief but very intense, and many people are unaccustomed to this level of effort. The expression "no pain, no gain" refers to working through the discomfort expected from such vigorous effort, rather than to willfully ignore extreme pain, which may indicate serious soft tissue injuries. The focus must be proper form, not the amount of weight lifted.

Discomfort can arise from other factors. Individuals who perform large numbers of repetitions, sets, and exercises for each muscle group may experience a burning sensation in their muscles. These individuals may also experience a swelling sensation in their muscles from increased blood flow also known as edema (the "pump"). True muscle fatigue is experienced as loss of power in muscles due to a lack of ATP, the energy used by our body, or a marked and uncontrollable loss of strength in a muscle, arising from the nervous system (motor unit) rather than from the muscle fibers themselves. Extreme neural fatigue can be experienced as temporary muscle failure. Some weight training programs, such as Metabolic Resistance Training, actively seek temporary muscle failure; evidence to support this type of training is mixed at best. Irrespective of their program, however, most athletes engaged in high-intensity weight training will experience muscle failure during their regimens.

Beginners are advised to build up slowly to a weight training program. Untrained individuals may have some muscles that are comparatively stronger than others; nevertheless, an injury can result if (in a particular exercise) the primary muscle is stronger than its stabilizing muscles. Building up slowly allows muscles time to develop appropriate strengths relative to each other. This can also help to minimize delayed onset muscle soreness. A sudden start to an intense program can cause significant muscular soreness. Unexercised muscles contain cross-linkages that are torn during intense exercise. A regimen of flexibility exercises should be implemented before and after workouts. Since weight training puts great strain on the muscles, it is necessary to warm-up properly. Kinetic stretching before a workout and static stretching after are a key part of flexibility and injury prevention.

Other precautions
Anyone beginning an intensive physical training program is typically advised to consult a physician, because of possible undetected heart or other conditions for which such activity is contraindicated.

Exercises like the bench press or the squat in which a failed lift can potentially result in the lifter becoming trapped under the weight are normally performed inside a power rack or in the presence of one or more spotters, who can safely re-rack the barbell if the weight trainer is unable to do so. In addition to spotters, knowledge of proper form and the use of safety bars can go a long way to keep a lifter from suffering injury due to a failed repetition.

Equipment

Weight training usually requires different types of equipment, but most commonly dumbbells, barbells, and weight machines. Various combinations of specific exercises, weights, and machines allow trainees to exercise the body in numerous ways.

Free weights
Free weights include dumbbells, barbells, medicine balls, sandbells, and kettlebells. Unlike weight machines, they do not constrain users to specific, fixed movements, and therefore require more effort from the individual's stabilizer muscles. It is often argued that free weight exercises are superior for precisely this reason. For example, they are recommended for golf players, since golf is a unilateral exercise that can break body balances, requiring exercises to keep the balance in muscles.

Some free weight exercises can be performed while sitting or lying on an exercise ball.

Weight machines

There are a number of weight machines that are commonly found in neighborhood gyms. The Smith machine is a barbell that is constrained to vertical movement. The cable machine consists of two weight stacks separated by 2.5 metres, with cables running through adjustable pulleys (that can be fixed at any height so as to select different amounts of weight) to various types of handles. There are also exercise-specific weight machines such as the leg press. A multigym includes a variety of exercise-specific mechanisms in one apparatus.

One limitation of many free weight exercises and exercise machines is that the muscle is working maximally against gravity during only a small portion of the lift. Some exercise-specific machines feature an oval cam (first introduced by Nautilus) which varies the resistance, so that the resistance, and the muscle force required, remains constant throughout the full range of motion of the exercise.

Other equipment

Other types of equipment include:
 Lifting straps, which allow more weight to be lifted by transferring the load to the wrists and avoiding limitations in forearm muscles and grip strength.
 Weightlifting belts, which are meant to brace the core through intra-abdominal pressure (and not directly assist the lower back muscles as commonly believed). Controversy exists regarding the safety of these devices and their proper use is often misunderstood. Powerlifting belts, which are thick and have the same width all around, are designed for maximum efficiency but can be uncomfortable, especially for athletes with a narrow waist, as they exert pressure on the ribs and hips during the lifts. Some rare models which are wide on the back and the front but narrower on the sides present a good compromise between comfort and efficiency. There are also controversial opinions about where the belt is worn. While most novice bodybuilders think the belt is worn on their abdomen to increase inter-abdominal pressure and brace the lower back, the belt is actually meant to be worn just below the ribcage or at the Solar Plexus, which causes increased inter-abdominal pressure instead of just squeezing the abdomen. 
 Weighted clothing, bags of sand, lead shot, or other materials that are strapped to wrists, ankles, torso, head, or other body parts to increase the amount of work required by muscles
 Gloves can improve grip, prevent the formation of calluses on the hands, relieve pressure on the wrists, and provide support.
 Chalk (MgCO3), which dries out sweaty hands, improving grip.
 Wrist and knee wraps.
 Shoes, which have a flat, rigid sole to provide a sturdy base of support, and may feature a raised heel of varying height (usually 0.5" or 0.75") to accommodate a lifter's biomechanics for more efficient squats, deadlifts, overhead presses, and Olympic lifts.
 Heavy chains and thick elastic bands can be attached to the weight in order to increase or decrease resistance at different phases of the movement. This is known as variable resistance training.

Types of exercise

Weight training is usually isotonic in nature. This means that there is a specific muscle being used and contracting due to a weight, leading to muscle contractions in that area of the body. This can be contrasted with isometric exercise where the joint angles remain constant i.e. the exercise is static in nature and involves holding a posture. A weight training exercise may involve both isotonic and isometric elements i.e. squatting with weight usually involves bending and straightening the legs (an isotonic action) while holding the weight steady (an isometric action).

Compound exercise

Compound exercises work several muscle groups at once, and include movement around two or more joints. For example, in the leg press, movement occurs around the hip, knee and ankle joints. This exercise is primarily used to develop the quadriceps, but it also involves the hamstrings, glutes and calves. Compound exercises are generally similar to the ways that people naturally push, pull and lift objects, whereas isolation exercises often feel a little unnatural.

Each type of exercise has its uses. Compound exercises build the basic strength that is needed to perform everyday pushing, pulling and lifting activities. Isolation exercises are useful for "rounding out" a routine, by directly exercising muscle groups that cannot be fully exercised in the compound exercises. A good example of an isolation exercise would be a dumbbell curl, as its primary function is to strengthen the bicep.

The type of exercise performed also depends on the individual's goals. Those who seek to increase their performance in sports would focus mostly on compound exercises, using isolation exercises to strengthen just those muscles that are holding the athlete back. Similarly, a powerlifter would focus on the specific compound exercises that are performed at powerlifting competitions. However, those who seek to improve the look of their body without necessarily maximizing their strength gains (including bodybuilders) would put more of an emphasis on isolation exercises. Both types of athletes, however, generally make use of both compound and isolation exercises.

Isolation exercise

An isolation exercise is one where the movement is restricted to one joint only. The goal of the exercise is to target a certain muscle group. For example, the leg extension is an isolation exercise for the quadriceps. Specialized types of equipment are used to ensure that other muscle groups are only minimally involved—they just help the individual maintain a stable posture—and movement occurs only around the knee joint. Isolation exercises involve machines, dumbbells, barbells (free weights), and pulley machines. Pulley machines and free weights can be used when combined with special/proper positions and joint bracing. Isolation exercises are important to help improve muscles that could be lacking from compound movements.

Most common exercises

The following exercises can be performed with a barbell or dumbbells. For each of them, there exist numerous variations. Most weight training exercises can improve grip strength due to the gripping of the weights.

Deadlift
A deadlift usually involves lifting a barbell from the floor up to thigh height. It is very effective at strengthening the legs, core and back. Along with squats, a person will usually be able to lift the greatest amount of weight with this lift. A special kind of hexagonal-shaped barbell called a trap bar (or hex bar) can be used to lift heavier weight and to maximize safety.

Squat
The squat involves holding a barbell across the shoulders and upper back and squatting down and standing up again. It is very effective at building leg and core strength. Ordinarily, the bar is lifted out of a rack at just below shoulder height, to begin with. It is frequently mentioned as being the most effective single weight training exercise for building all-around physical strength. A front squat is a variation that involves holding the barbell in front of the torso and resting it on the tops of the shoulders and the upper chest.

Bench press
For the bench press a person lies with their back on a bench. They hold a barbell over their chest and lower and lift it. It is an exercise designed to strengthen the arms and upper body, especially the shoulders and chest.

Bicep curls
Bicep curls are usually performed with dumbbells and involve holding them at hip height before lifting them up to just over shoulder height with a bending action of the arm. They are used to strengthen the arms and especially the biceps.

Overhead press
The overhead press involves holding dumbbells at just over shoulder height and pressing them upwards and lowering them again. This exercise is used to strengthen the arms, shoulders and upper body.

Types of workout

Push-pull workout
A push–pull workout is a method of arranging a weight training routine so that exercises alternate between push motions and pull motions. A push–pull superset is two complementary segments (one pull/one push) done back-to-back. An example is bench press (push) / bent-over row (pull). Another push–pull technique is to arrange workout routines so that one day involves only push (usually chest, shoulders and triceps) exercises, and an alternate day only pull (usually back and biceps) exercises so the body can get adequate rest.

Variable resistance workout
Variable resistance training involves varying the resistance for different phases of a range of movement. This may be achieved by adding heavy chains or thick elastic bands to an exercise. For example, chains may be attached to the ends of a barbell during a bench press exercise. When the bar is lowered more of the chain rests on the floor resulting in less weight being lifted,  and vice versa when the bar is raised. The elastic nature of bands can serve a similar function of increasing resistance. Another form of variable resistance training involves combining partial repetitions with a heavier weight with full repetitions with a lighter weight. The advantage of variable resistance training is that it more effectively strengthens the different phases of a persons strength curve for that movement. Strength curve is a graphical term which refers to the phases of strength which a person moves through when performing an exercise. For example, when a person is performing a back squat they are strongest at the top of the movement and weakest at the bottom. If they do a full squat at 1RM then this 1RM is based upon the lower weaker phase of the movement. As they have to move through this phase to complete a full rep, they cannot ordinarily lift a weight heavier than they can manage here. This is even though the weight they are lifting is only about 66% of their 1RM for the stronger phase. Variable resistance training provides a solution to this problem. By adding resistance during a repetition, or by combining heavier partial reps with lighter full reps, the same percentage of 1RM for both the stronger and weaker phase respectively can be lifted. A person following this training method may become stronger and more explosive as a result.

Health benefits
Benefits of weight training include increased strength, muscle mass, endurance, bone and bone mineral density, insulin sensitivity, GLUT 4 density, HDL cholesterol, improved cardiovascular health and appearance, and decreased body fat, blood pressure, LDL cholesterol and triglycerides.

The body's basal metabolic rate increases with increases in muscle mass, which promotes long-term fat loss and helps dieters avoid yo-yo dieting. Moreover, intense workouts elevate metabolism for several hours following the workout, which also promotes fat loss.

Weight training also provides functional benefits. Stronger muscles improve posture, provide better support for joints, and reduce the risk of injury from everyday activities. Older people who take up weight training can prevent some of the loss of muscle tissue that normally accompanies aging—and even regain some functional strength—and by doing so, become less frail. They may be able to avoid some types of physical disability. Weight-bearing exercise also helps to increase bone density to prevent osteoporosis. The benefits of weight training for older people have been confirmed by studies of people who began engaging in it even in their eighties and nineties.

For many people in rehabilitation or with an acquired disability, such as following stroke or orthopedic surgery, strength training for weak muscles is a key factor to optimize recovery. For people with such a health condition, their strength training is likely to need to be designed by an appropriate health professional, such as a physiotherapist.

Stronger muscles improve performance in a variety of sports. Sport-specific training routines are used by many competitors. These often specify that the speed of muscle contraction during weight training should be the same as that of the particular sport. Sport-specific training routines also often include variations to both free weight and machine movements that may not be common for traditional weightlifting.

Though weight training can stimulate the cardiovascular system, many exercise physiologists, based on their observation of optimal oxygen uptake, argue that aerobics training is a better cardiovascular stimulus. Central catheter monitoring during resistance training reveals increased cardiac output, suggesting that strength training shows potential for cardiovascular exercise. However, a 2007 meta-analysis found that, though aerobic training is an effective therapy for heart failure patients, combined aerobic and strength training is ineffective; "the favorable antiremodeling role of aerobic exercise was not confirmed when this mode of exercise was combined with strength training".

One side-effect of any intense exercise is increased levels of dopamine, serotonin and norepinephrine, which can help to improve mood and counter feelings of depression.

Weight training has also been shown to benefit dieters as it inhibits lean body mass loss (as opposed to fat loss) when under a caloric deficit. Weight training also strengthens bones, helping to prevent bone loss and osteoporosis. By increasing muscular strength and improving balance, weight training can also reduce falls by elderly persons. Weight training is also attracting attention for the benefits it can have on the brain, and in older adults, a 2017 meta analysis found that it was effective in improving cognitive performance.

Weight training is a key component to maintain strength and size. To maintain size, the level of intensity of workouts will go down and number of calories can decrease due to less activity. Time spent in the gym can decrease to give the body more time to rest.

Studies also show that weight training has significant benefits for an individual's mental health. Strength training has shown to reduce symptoms of anxiety, depression, and insomnia.

Weight training and other types of strength training
The benefits of weight training overall are comparable to most other types of strength training: increased muscle, tendon and ligament strength, bone density, flexibility, tone, metabolic rate, and postural support. This type of training will also help prevent injury for athletes. There are benefits and limitations to weight training as compared to other types of strength training. Contrary to popular belief, weight training can be beneficial for both men and women.

Weight training and bodybuilding
Although weight training is similar to bodybuilding, they have different objectives. Bodybuilders use weight training to develop their muscles for size, shape, and symmetry regardless of any increase in strength for competition in bodybuilding contests; they train to maximize their muscular size and develop extremely low levels of body fat. In contrast, many weight trainers train to improve their strength and anaerobic endurance while not giving special attention to reducing body fat far below normal.

Complex training
In complex training, weight training is typically combined with plyometric exercises in an alternating sequence. Ideally, the weight lifting exercise and the plyometric exercise should move through similar ranges of movement i.e. a back squat at 85-95% 1RM followed by a vertical jump. An advantage of this form of training is that it allows the intense activation of the nervous system and increased muscle fiber recruitment from the weight lifting exercise to be utilized in the subsequent plyometric exercise; thereby improving the power with which it can be performed. Over a period of training, this may enhance the athlete's ability to apply power. The plyometric exercise may be replaced with a sports specific action. The intention being to utilize the neural and muscular activation from the heavy lift in the sports specific action, in order to be able to perform it more powerfully. Over a period of training this may enhance the athlete's ability to perform that sports specific action more powerfully, without a precursory heavy lift being required.

Ballistic training
Ballistic training involves throwing a weight such as a medicine ball or slam ball. The ball may be thrown as far as possible, or thrown into a wall and caught on the rebound etc. Whilst the term ballistic strictly refers to throwing, in its modern usage as a categorical term it is sometimes construed more broadly. In such cases ballistic training can be said to focus on maximizing the acceleration phase of a movement and minimizing the deceleration phase. This is done in order to increase the power of the movement overall. For example, throwing a weight, jumping whilst holding a weight, or swinging a weight. These actions can be contrasted with standard weight lifting exercises where there is a distinct deceleration phase at the end of the repetition which stops the weight from moving.

Weighted jumps (loaded plyometrics)

Weighted jumps, also known as loaded plyometrics, involve jumping whilst holding a weight, such as a trap bar or dumbbells, or jumping while wearing a weight such as a weighted vest or ankle weights. Weighted jumps are commonly used in a training regime to increase explosive power. Many sports such as rugby, gridiron, and others recommend their players do plyometric training to train explosive power.

Contrast loading
Contrast loading is the alternation of heavy and light loads. Considered as sets, the heavy load is performed at about 85-95% 1 repetition max; the light load should be considerably lighter at about 30-60% 1RM. Both sets should be performed fast with the lighter set being performed as fast as possible. The joints should not be locked as this inhibits muscle fiber recruitment and reduces the speed at which the exercise can be performed. The lighter set may be a loaded plyometric exercise such as  loaded squat jumps or jumps with a trap bar.

Similarly to complex training, contrast loading relies upon the enhanced activation of the nervous system and increased muscle fiber recruitment from the heavy set, to allow the lighter set to be performed more powerfully.  A physiological effect is commonly referred to as post-activation potentiation, or the PAP effect. Contrast loading can effectively demonstrate the PAP effect: if a light weight is lifted, and then a heavy weight is lifted, and then the same light weight is lifted again, then the light weight will feel lighter the second time it has been lifted. This is due to the enhanced PAP effect which occurs as a result of the heavy lift being utilized in the subsequent lighter lift; thus making the weight feel lighter and allowing the lift to be performed more powerfully.

Weight training versus isometric training

Isometric exercise provides a maximum amount of resistance based on the force output of the muscle, or muscles pitted against one another. This maximum force maximally strengthens the muscles over all of the joint angles at which the isometric exercise occurs. By comparison, weight training also strengthens the muscle throughout the range of motion the joint is trained in, but only maximally at one angle, causing a lesser increase in physical strength at other angles from the initial through terminating joint angle as compared with isometric exercise. In addition, the risk of injury from weights used in weight training is greater than with isometric exercise (no weights), and the risk of asymmetric training is also greater than with isometric exercise of identical opposing muscles.

See also 

Anaerobic exercise
Endurance
Exercise equipment
Flywheel training
Health club
Isometric exercise
List of weight training exercises
Physical exercise
Physical fitness
Power training
Supercompensation

Notes

References

Bibliography
 
 
 
 
 
 
 
 
 
 

 
Bodybuilding
Physical exercise
Exercise physiology
Strength training

ang:Ȝearƿung (indryhtu)#Strengþuȝearƿung